Blade: Music from and Inspired by the Motion Picture is the soundtrack to Stephen Norrington's 1998 film Blade. It was released on August 25, 1998, through TVT Soundtrax/Epic Records, and featured a wide range of musical genres including hip hop, techno, electronic and alternative rock.

The album managed to make it to #36 on the Billboard 200 in the United States and #16 on the Top 100 Albums in Germany. It spawned four singles: "Wrek Tha Discotek", "Reservations", "Deadly Zone" and "1/2 & 1/2". "Wrek Tha Discotek" peaked at #42 on the Hot Dance Music/Club Play chart in the US. The album was certified Gold by the Recording Industry Association of America on May 19, 1999, for sales of over 500,000 copies.

Blade: Music from and Inspired by the Motion Picture

Track listing

Charts

Certifications

Blade: Original Motion Picture Score

Blade: Original Motion Picture Score is an instrumental film score by American musician Mark Isham, which was released on September 8, 1998, through Varèse Sarabande. Recording sessions took place at Newman Scoring Stage, 20th Century Fox.

Isham's score album won the 1999 ASCAP Film and Television Music Award in the category "Top Box Office Films".

Track listing

Notes
 Track 2 incorporates "Rainbow Voice" from Hearing Solar Winds (1983), courtesy of David Hykes and OCORA Radio France.

References

External links
 
 

1990s film soundtrack albums
Film scores
Techno albums
1998 soundtrack albums
Hip hop soundtracks
Electronic soundtracks
Mark Isham soundtracks
TVT Records soundtracks
Epic Records soundtracks
Varèse Sarabande soundtracks
Albums produced by DJ Premier
Marvel Comics film soundtracks
Blade (franchise)